901 Brunsia is an S-type asteroid belonging to the Flora family in the Main Belt. Its rotation period is 3.136 hours.

References

External links
 
 

000901
Discoveries by Max Wolf
Named minor planets
000901
19180830